The 2023 Clásica de Almería was the 38th edition of the Clásica de Almería one-day road cycling race. It was held on 12 February 2023 as a category 1. Pro race on the 2023 UCI ProSeries.

Teams 
11 of the 18 UCI WorldTeams and 10 UCI ProTeams made up the 21 teams that participated in the race. All teams entered a full squad of seven riders each. In total, 145 riders started the race, of which 140 finished.

UCI WorldTeams

 
 
 
 
 
 
 
 
 
 
 

UCI ProTeams

Result

References

Sources

External links 
 

2023
Clásica de Almería
Clásica de Almería
Clásica de Almería
2020s in Andalusia